"The Rose" is a pop song written by Amanda McBroom.  Bette Midler made the song famous when she recorded it for her 1979 film The Rose, in which it plays during the closing credits. It has been recorded multiple times, including by Conway Twitty and Westlife who had US Country & Western and UK number one hits with the song, respectively. Nana Mouskouri recorded a German version (Die Rose), also in 1980, as well as an English version.

Background and Bette Midler version
"The Rose" was first recorded by Bette Midler for the soundtrack of the 1979 film The Rose, in which it plays under the closing credits. However, the song was not written for the movie: Amanda McBroom recalls, "I wrote it in 1977 [or] 1978, and I sang it occasionally in clubs. ... Jim Nabors had a local talk show, and I sang ["The Rose"] on his show once." According to McBroom, she wrote "The Rose" in response to her manager's suggestion that she write "some Bob Seger-type tunes" to expedite a record deal: McBroom obliged by writing "The Rose" in 45 minutes. Said McBroom: "'The Rose' is ... just one verse [musically] repeated three times. When I finished it, I realized it doesn't have a bridge or a hook, but I couldn't think of anything to [add]."

McBroom's composition was one of seven songs selected by Midler from thirty song possibilities proffered by Paul A. Rothchild, the producer of The Rose soundtrack album. Reportedly Rothchild had listened to over 3,000 songs in order to assemble those thirty possibilities.

Released as the second single from The Rose soundtrack album, "The Rose" hit number 1 on the Cashbox Top 100 and peaked at number 3 on the Billboard Hot 100 chart. Additionally, it was number 1 on the Adult Contemporary chart for five weeks running. The single was certified Gold by the RIAA for over a million copies sold in the United States.

Midler won the Grammy Award for Best Female Pop Vocal Performance for "The Rose", beating out formidable competition from Barbra Streisand and Donna Summer among others.

There are two mixes of the song. The single mix features orchestration, while the version in the film (and on its soundtrack) includes an extended introduction while doing away with the orchestration in favor of piano-and-vocals only.

"The Rose" did not receive a nomination for the Academy Award for Best Original Song. Despite not having been recorded prior to the soundtrack of the film The Rose, the song had not been written for the film. According to McBroom, AMPAS inquired of her if the song had been written for the movie, and McBroom answered honestly (that it had not). McBroom did however win the Golden Globe Award for Best Original Song for "The Rose", as that award's governing body, the Hollywood Foreign Press Association (HFPA), does not share AMPAS' official meticulousness over a nominated song's being completely original with its parent film.

In 2004 "The Rose" finished #83 in AFI's 100 Years...100 Songs survey of the top tunes in American cinema.

Personnel
 Bette Midler - lead vocals
 David Campbell - string arrangements
 Lincoln Mayorga - piano
 Amanda McBroom - harmony vocals

Charts

Weekly charts

Year-end charts

Certifications

Conway Twitty version

Country singer Conway Twitty recorded a cover version in 1982. His version, from his album Dream Maker, was a number one country hit in US and Canada; it became his 30th number one single on the US country chart.

Track listing
7-inch single
 The Rose - 3:32
 It's Only Make Believe - 2:18

Charts

Weekly charts

Year-end charts

The Dubliners version

The Dubliners recorded a duet with the Hothouse Flowers for Rose Week and released "The Rose" as a single in 1991, reaching no. 2 in the Irish Singles Chart.

Charts

Westlife version

"The Rose" was covered by Irish boy band Westlife and was released as the first and only single from their seventh studio album The Love Album (2006). It reached number one on the UK Singles Chart, becoming the group's 14th and most recent number-one single in the United Kingdom. The single has sold over 200,000 copies in the UK to earn a silver certification from the British Phonographic Industry (BPI).

Music video
The video for this single was presented in two versions: one in black and white and the other in color. It shows the emotions and events leading up to a couple's wedding procession. The band members are clad in suits and are shown in a checkered-floor room. During the initial period of the video's release, fans were given the opportunity to customise the music video by digitally adding their names to various elements such as the wedding invitation card.

Track listings
UK CD1
 "The Rose" – 3:40
 "Solitaire" – 5:07

UK CD2
 "The Rose" – 3:40
 "Nothing's Gonna Change My Love for You" – 3:47
 "If" – 2:42
 "The Rose" (video) – 3:55

Charts

Weekly charts

Year-end charts

Certifications

In popular culture
An adaptation of the song entitled "Hǎo xiǎng nǐ" (好想你, "I Truly Miss You") by Taiwanese singer YoYo (金瑞瑶) was released in 1984. The song was featured in the ending scene of the 1991 Studio Ghibli film Only Yesterday, directed by Isao Takahata. The ending theme song, sung by Miyako Harumi, is titled "Ai wa Hana, Kimi wa sono Tane" (愛は花、君はその種子, "Love Is a Flower, You Are the Seed"), a Japanese translation of Amanda McBroom's composition "The Rose".

The song appears in Napoleon Dynamite in the scene where he is performing with the Happy Hands Club for his class. The song also appeared in the Richard Simmons exercise video Dance Your Pants Off!. A cover of the song was featured in the 2008 Family Guy episode "Baby Not on Board". During the episode, the Griffin family (except for Stewie) sings the song as a family road trip song. The song was also covered in the episode "Maybe Tomorrow" of True Detective, and in the first episode of the third season of Goliath.

A six part a cappella arrangement of the song by Nic Raines, created for The King's Singers, was included in the King's Singers 2019 EP release "The Library, Vol. 1" and also in a 2019 music video for YouTube. The song was featured in the 2021 Korean drama series Youth of May, aired on KBS2.

References

External links
  by Amanda McBroom
 

1977 songs
1980 singles
1983 singles
1991 singles
2006 singles
Bette Midler songs
Conway Twitty songs
Westlife songs
Eva Cassidy songs
Song recordings produced by Jimmy Bowen
Song recordings produced by Paul A. Rothchild
Cashbox number-one singles
Irish Singles Chart number-one singles
Number-one singles in Scotland
UK Singles Chart number-one singles
Best Original Song Golden Globe winning songs
Pop ballads
Atlantic Records singles
Elektra Records singles
Soul ballads
Sony Music singles
RCA Records singles
Sony BMG singles
Grammy Award for Best Female Pop Vocal Performance
1970s ballads
Songs written by Amanda McBroom